HD 158633 is a main sequence star in the northern constellation of Draco. With an apparent visual magnitude of 
6.43, this star is a challenge to view with the unaided eye but it can be seen clearly with a small telescope. Based upon parallax measurements, it is located at a distance of around 42 light years from the Sun. The star is drifting closer to the Sun with a radial velocity of −39 km/s, and is predicted to come to within  in around 190,400 years.

This is a K-type main sequence star with a spectral classification of K0 V. It has about 79% of the Sun's radius and 73% of the solar mass. It is an estimated 4.3 billion years old and is spinning with a projected rotational velocity of 3.4 km/s. The star is emitting an excess of infrared radiation at a wavelength of 70 μm, suggesting the presence of an orbiting debris disk. It has a low metallicity, with only 37% of the Sun's abundance of elements more massive than helium, and has a relatively high proper motion.

References

K-type main-sequence stars
Solar-type stars
Circumstellar disks

Draco (constellation)
Durchmusterung objects
0675
158633
085235
6518